Arthur Francis Meredyth (1726 – 1775) was an Anglo-Irish politician.

Meredyth represented Meath in the Irish House of Commons from 1751 to 1760.

References

1726 births
1775 deaths
18th-century Anglo-Irish people
Irish MPs 1727–1760
Members of the Parliament of Ireland (pre-1801) for County Meath constituencies
Arthur